Pink Cadillac is a 1989 American action comedy film about a bounty hunter and a group of white supremacists chasing after an innocent woman who tries to outrun everyone in her husband's prized pink Cadillac. The film stars Clint Eastwood and Bernadette Peters and also has small cameo appearances by Jim Carrey and Bryan Adams. Pink Cadillac marks the third and final collaboration between Eastwood and director Buddy Van Horn, following Any Which Way You Can (1980) and The Dead Pool (1988), as well as Van Horn's final film as a director.

Plot 
A white supremacist group is chasing Lou Ann (Bernadette Peters), whose husband Roy (Timothy Carhart) is a member. She has inadvertently taken counterfeit money from them by running away with his car (the pink Cadillac), which held the supremacists' stash.

Tommy Nowak (Clint Eastwood) is a skip-tracer whose speciality is dressing up in disguises, such as a rodeo clown, to fool whomever he is after. Tommy takes on the job of finding Lou Ann because she skipped bail.

When he finally finds her in Reno, Nevada, Tommy slowly becomes enamored. Roy and his gang kidnap her baby, whom Lou Ann has left with her sister (Frances Fisher), so Tommy decides to help Lou Ann get the baby back instead of turning her in. While driving through the West, seeking the baby, romance blossoms. They eventually fight the white supremacists and retrieve the baby.

Cast 
 Clint Eastwood as Tommy Nowak
 Bernadette Peters as Lou Ann McGuinn
 Timothy Carhart as Roy McGuinn
 John Dennis Johnston as Waycross
 Michael Des Barres as Alex
 Jimmie F. Skaggs as Bill Dunston
 Bill Moseley as Darrell
 Gerry Bamman as Buddy	 
 Michael Champion as Ken Lee
 William Hickey as Mr. Barton
 Geoffrey Lewis as Ricky Z
 Dirk Blocker as Policeman #1
 Frances Fisher as Dinah
 Paul Benjamin as Judge
 Bryan Adams as Gas Station Attendant
 Mara Corday as Stick Lady
 Jim Carrey as Lounge Entertainer
 James Cromwell as Motel Desk Clerk
 Bill McKinney as Coltersville Bartender

Production
Filming began in late 1988, and took place in Utah and Nevada.
Parts filmed in Quincy, Cresent Mills, west shore lake almanor, all Plumas County

Soundtrack

The film's soundtrack features ten songs, all done by various country and rock artists. The album peaked at number 45 on the Billboard Top Country Albums in July 1989.

Track listing

Reception
The film received generally poor reviews. Caryn James wrote: "When it's time to look back on the strange sweep of Clint Eastwood's career, from his ambitious direction of Bird to his coarse, classic Dirty Harry character, Pink Cadillac will probably settle comfortably near the bottom of the list. It is the laziest sort of action comedy, with lumbering chase scenes, a dull-witted script and the charmless pairing of Mr. Eastwood and Bernadette Peters." (New York Times, May 26, 1989.)

Hal Hinson praised the performers: Peters "...plays her comic scenes with a vivacious abandon..." She "loosens him (Eastwood) up... and humanizes him. These two make a nifty comic team."

Pink Cadillac was released in May 1989, opening against Indiana Jones and the Last Crusade. The film eventually grossed $12,143,484. In contrast, the movie Eastwood made just prior to Pink Cadillac, the fifth Dirty Harry movie, The Dead Pool, grossed $37,903,295. Perhaps due to the poor reviews and meager box office, the film is, as of 2021, Eastwood's last action comedy.

It has a 24% rating on Rotten Tomatoes from 21 reviews. It also went direct to video in the United Kingdom, without a cinema release.

References

Bibliography

External links 
 
 
 
 

1989 films
1989 action comedy films
1980s chase films
1980s musical films
American action comedy films
American chase films
Cadillac
Country music films
Films about automobiles
Films directed by Buddy Van Horn
Films produced by David Valdes
Films scored by Steve Dorff
Films set in Reno, Nevada
Malpaso Productions films
Warner Bros. films
1980s English-language films
1980s American films